Azealia Amanda Banks (born May 31, 1991) is an American rapper, singer and songwriter. Raised in the Harlem neighborhood of New York City, she began releasing music through Myspace in 2008 before being signed to XL Recordings at age 18. In 2011, her debut single "212" went viral and entered several international charts. She subsequently signed with Interscope and Polydor Records before later separating in July 2013.

Banks became an independent artist and started her own independent record label, Chaos & Glory Recordings. She is currently signed to Parlophone and Warner Records. She has professionally released two mixtapes (Fantasea in 2012, and Slay-Z in 2016), one studio album (Broke with Expensive Taste in 2014), and two extended plays (1991 in 2012 and Icy Colors Change in 2018). In December 2017, Banks had her film debut in the musical drama Love Beats Rhymes, portraying the lead character. 

Banks' works have garnered acclaim from critics, drawing on various sounds including dutch house, rap, pop, electronic music and avant-garde. "212" has been listed as one of the best songs of 2011 and one of the defining songs of the decade by music publications, including Rolling Stone and Billboard. 

Throughout her career, Banks's social media presence and outspoken views, especially on U.S. politics and race, have attracted significant controversy.

Life and career

Early life and career beginnings
Azealia Amanda Banks was born on May 31, 1991, in New York City's Manhattan borough; she was the youngest of three. Her single mother raised her and her two siblings in Harlem, after their father died of pancreatic cancer when she was two years old. Following her father's death, Banks says that her mother "became really abusive—physically and verbally. Like she would hit me and my sisters with baseball bats, bang our heads up against walls, and she would always tell me I was ugly. I remember once she threw out all the food in the fridge, just so we wouldn't have anything to eat." Due to escalating violence, Banks moved out of her mother's home at age 14 to live with her older sister.

At a young age, Banks became interested in musical theater, dancing, acting, and singing. At age 16, she starred in a production of the comedy-noir musical City of Angels, where she was found by an agent who sent her to auditions for TBS, Nickelodeon, and Law & Order, all without success. At this point Banks decided to end her pursuit of an acting career, citing the stiff competition and overall sense of nonfulfillment. Because of this lack of fulfillment, she began writing rap and R&B songs as a creative outlet. She never finished high school, instead choosing to follow her dream of becoming a recording artist.

Under the moniker Miss Bank$, she released her debut recording, "Gimme a Chance", online on November 9, 2008. The recording was accompanied by the self-produced track "Seventeen", which sampled the Ladytron song of the same name. Banks sent both tracks to American DJ Diplo. Later that year, she signed a development deal with record label XL Recordings and began working with producer Richard Russell in London, leaving the label later that year due to conflicting ideas.

2011–2012: 1991 and Fantasea

 After leaving XL Recordings, Banks dropped the 'Miss Bank$' moniker and formally became Azealia Banks, which preceded a move to Montreal. Using YouTube as a portal, she uploaded several demo tracks, including "L8R" and a cover of "Slow Hands" by Interpol. After her Canadian visa expired, Banks returned to New York, where she sold keychains at a Manhattan jazz club and danced at a Queens strip club to make ends meet. "That's when I was really depressed", Banks said. "I don't have a manager, I don't have a boyfriend, I don't have any friends, I don't have any money. Here I am working at the strip club, trying not to say the wrong thing and get into fights with these girls who don't give a shit."

In September 2011, Banks released her debut single, "212", as a free digital download from her website. It was released officially on December 6, 2011, as the lead single from her EP 1991. The track attained European moderate chart success, peaking at #14 in the Netherlands, #12 in the United Kingdom and #7 in Ireland.

Though unsigned at the time, Banks began working with British producer Paul Epworth on a debut studio album. It was announced in December 2011 that she would feature on "Shady Love", a track on American band Scissor Sisters' fourth studio album, Magic Hour, though the feature was uncredited. An accompanying music video was released in January 2012 following its radio premiere from Annie Mac (BBC Radio 1) on January 4, though the single's release was canceled for unconfirmed reasons. Banks released the track "NEEDSUMLUV (SXLND)" on the Internet on January 16, 2012, coinciding with what would have been the 33rd birthday of the late singer Aaliyah, who is sampled on the track. A week later saw the emergence of a second track, "Bambi", produced by Paul Epworth and selected as the soundtrack for a Thierry Mugler fashion show in Paris.

In May 2012, Banks announced plans to release a mixtape—originally titled Fantastic—titled Fantasea. Preceding its release the tracks "Jumanji", "Aquababe", and "Nathan" (featuring rapper Styles P) were made available online. Fantasea was released via Banks's Twitter account on July 11, and was succeeded by the unveiling of Banks's online radio project, Kunt.FM the following week.

Banks's first EP, 1991, was released in the UK on May 28 and in the US the next day. The 4-track EP, which includes 212, was not eligible for the UK Albums chart, but the title track charted at #79 on the UK Singles chart. It also reached #133 on the US 200, while reaching #17 on the US R&B/Hip-Hop chart, #12 on the US Rap chart, and headin' US Heat chart. In 2013, 1991 was certified gold by the Australian Recording Industry Association.

Banks was scheduled to release her second single, "Esta Noche", from Fantasea, on September 25, 2012, but it was pulled the day of its release due to sampling disputes between Banks and its producer, Munchi. The next month, it was confirmed that Banks had worked with Lady Gaga on two tracks, "Ratchet" and "Red Flame", on Gaga's third studio album, Artpop (2013), but they did not make the final album cut, and have since not been released. Banks also revealed that she collaborated with Kanye West on G.O.O.D. Music's compilation album Cruel Summer but that her contributions did not make the final cut. On December 31, 2012, Banks released "BBD", which ultimately appeared on her debut album, Broke with Expensive Taste.

2013–2016: Broke with Expensive Taste and Slay-Z

Early in 2012, Banks revealed that her debut album would be called Broke with Expensive Taste, and said the album would include contributions from musicians including Toko Yasuda, Theophilus London, Kevin Hussein, and Ariel Pink. She initially said the album's lead single would be a track titled "Miss Amor" and that it would be accompanied by a B-side, "Miss Camaraderie", both produced by Lone, but these plans changed: in January 2013 she announced that the first official single from the album would be "Yung Rapunxel", which was released in March 2013 through SoundCloud.

In May 2013, Banks announced that the second single from Broke with Expensive Taste would be "ATM Jam", featuring Pharrell. On June 29, she debuted the song at the 2013 Glastonbury Festival, with New York City radio station Hot 97 premiering a clean, shortened version of the studio recording three days later. On July 11, the full studio version of "ATM Jam" was released on BBC Radio 1. Banks confirmed in November 2013 that "ATM Jam" would not appear on Broke with Expensive Taste due to negative fan feedback and personal disinterest regarding the song.

Banks announced in mid-July that after a long battle, she had parted ways with Universal Music Group. She reportedly has possession and the rights to the work she released with Interscope. On July 28, 2014, Banks released the official second single from Broke with Expensive Taste, titled "Heavy Metal and Reflective", on her own label, Azealia Banks Records.

Banks surprise-released Broke with Expensive Taste under Prospect Park on iTunes on November 7, 2014. The physical album was released on March 3, 2015. In 2015, Banks performed at the Coachella Valley Music and Arts Festival and posed nude for the April issue of Playboy, shot by Ellen von Unwerth. In late 2015, Banks revealed that she was unable to release new music until March 2016, due to the separation from her label, Prospect Park, but as of February 2016 she was officially cleared of her contract and able to release new music.

In February 2016, Banks released the single, "The Big Big Beat", with its official video uploaded to Vevo in April. The song would serve as the lead single to Banks's second mixtape, Slay-Z, which was released on March 24, 2016. In July 2017, Slay-Z was reissued to iTunes, Spotify, and other online music stores under her independent record label, Chaos & Glory Recordings. The re-issue would include the Lunice collaboration, "Crown", which was released as the project's sole bonus track.

2017–present: Icy Colors Change & upcoming projects

In early 2017, Banks launched her online store, CheapyXO. The site features artist merchandise from Banks as well as original skin care products. The site also includes "CheapyXO Radio" which links to a playlist curated by Banks herself. Banks would later relaunch the site in 2020 to include her podcast, Cheapy's Two Cents, as well as, "Botantica XO", which is composed of spiritual items.

Banks announced that her next project will be Fantasea II: The Second Wave, a follow-up to 2012 mixtape Fantasea. On June 5, 2017, Banks released the song "Chi Chi" intended to be the lead single from Business & Pleasure, however, it was later demoted to a stand-alone single. On June 26, 2017, Banks released the promotional single, "Escapades", from the upcoming album Fantasea II: The Second Wave. After a yearlong hiatus from touring, Banks returned to New York City to embark on a North American tour with 20 dates across the U.S. and Canada. The tour began on October 4 in Chicago and concluded on October 31 in San Francisco. Banks also performed across Europe in a handful of shows during 2017.

It was announced in 2015 that Banks would make her acting debut as the main character in the RZA-directed musical drama film Coco (now known as Love Beats Rhymes). The film was officially released on December 1, 2017.

On January 31, 2018, Banks announced that she had signed a US$1 million record deal with Entertainment One. On March 9, 2018, she released "Movin' On Up" to iTunes and other streaming platforms as the second promotional single from Fantasea II: The Second Wave. The song was previously featured in the 2017 film Love Beats Rhymes which Banks starred in. In March 2018, she announced that the first official single from her forthcoming album would be "Anna Wintour". It was released on April 6, 2018, and the official music video for the single was released on May 24, 2018. On July 6, a second single, "Treasure Island", was released. In November, Banks announced on her Instagram account that she would release the Christmas-themed EP Icy Colors Change on December 7. A demo of the title track was released in December 2017. The project was released on December 19 after several delays, with a promotional single, "What Are You Doing New Year's Eve?", released on December 13. Another promotional single from Fantasea II: The Second Wave, "Playhouse", was released exclusively on SoundCloud on April 12, 2019. Banks first teased the track back in 2016 by playing the entire song on the live streaming app, Periscope.

Banks would later separate from eOne Music in 2019. Consequently, Banks announced in May of that year that she had been working on a project called Yung Rapunxel: Pt. II. The title references Banks's debut single off Broke with Expensive Taste called "Yung Rapunxel". It was released through SoundCloud on September 11, 2019, before later being taken down. Banks would cover Elle Russia in November 2019.

On December 16, 2019, Banks released the promotional singles "Count Contessa" and "Pyrex Princess" on various streaming platforms. "Pyrex Princess" is a song from Business & Pleasure, previously released on August 22, 2018, before being taken down. "Count Contessa" was previously published on SoundCloud in 2013. A music video for "Count Contessa", directed by Rony Alwin and shot in Bali, Indonesia, was previously released on December 8, 2015.

Throughout the first quarter of 2020, Banks debuted her podcast Cheapy's Two Cents and released multiple promotional singles, including "Slow Hands", an Interpol cover previously uploaded in 2012, as well as "Salchichón" being produced by frequent collaborator Onyx. Additionally, Banks released multiple tracks exclusively on her SoundCloud, such as "Diamond Nova", which previously served as the B-side to her 2013 single "ATM Jam", featuring and produced by Pharrell, as well as the Spanglish single, "Nirvana".

On June 9, 2020, Banks released the lead single from her as-yet-unreleased album Business & Pleasure titled "Black Madonna" featuring producer Lex Luger. On December 23, 2020, Banks released the promotional single "Mamma Mia" on all platforms, where it was previously released on her SoundCloud account since April 2020. Banks released the single "Six Flags" featuring Slim Dollars on January 7, 2021.

On July 7, 2021, Banks released the single "Fuck Him All Night". A perfume of the same name was launched months later. Banks also announced that she was under new management.

On November 9, 2022, Banks announced that she had officially signed to Parlophone Records, under Warner Music Group.

On January 10, 2023, Banks announced via. Twitter that "New Bottega" would be released in February. This is after the song was originally set for an August 2022 release.

Artistry 

Banks has said she admires American recording artists Beyoncé and Aaliyah, stating the former "[is] the queen of everything. She's the most remarkable performer and musician. And this is just my humble opinion, but I just think she's better than everyone else making music right now." Banks is inspired by, and has drawn directly upon, black gay culture, such as the film Paris Is Burning, in her music.

AllMusic characterizes Banks as "a stylish vocalist who combines hardcore hip-hop, indie pop, and dance music". Meanwhile, The Guardians John Robinson considered Banks's style "an appealing blend of Missy Elliott and dance-pop". In regards to her musical style, Banks has frequently been noted for the use of profanity in many of her songs, particularly her reclamation of the word "cunt", examples including her debut single "212", in which she uses the word more than ten times, or other songs such as "Fierce", in which she refers to herself as the "cunt queen". Banks attributes this to her upbringing in Harlem, saying, "...I'm from Harlem. I went to art school; I grew up with the cunts. And that term doesn't come from me! People think I invented it, but I didn't. To be cunty is to be feminine and to be, like, aware of yourself. Nobody's fucking with that inner strength and delicateness. The cunts, the gay men, adore that. My friends would say, 'Oh you need to cunt it up! You're being too banjee.' Banjee means unrefined and rough. You need your cunts: they fix your hair for you and do your makeup. They give you confidence and give you life." She is also known for her often fast-paced rapping, or "flow". In a review of Banks's debut EP 1991, Chris Dart of Exclaim! found Banks's rapping speed "remarkable", commenting that she "manages a feat that takes most rappers the better part of a career to master: the perfect marriage of bangin', club-friendly beats and smart, crisply delivered lyrics".

Since writing "212", Banks has adopted an alter ego named "Yung Rapunxel". This alter ego was adapted from Banks referring to herself as Rapunzel, due to a long weave she wore while working at Starbucks as a teenager. Banks discussed this with Rolling Stone saying, "Yung Rapunxel is that girl who pisses people off but doesn't really mean to. She's actually a sweetheart! But people are so taken aback that she's so herself; she's not even trying to be unique or different. She literally just lives in her head; she does what she wants to do. So, the lipstick is here for someone who is happy to be themself."

Personal life 
In October 2019, Banks announced that she would perform under the name Azilka during her tour in the former Soviet Union.

On August 8, 2020, Banks announced that she intended to end her life through euthanasia and document the process on film.

In February 2021, Banks publicly announced her engagement to American artist Ryder Ripps. They made an audio sex tape and sold it using NFT, which was then up for resale for $260 million. In March, Banks announced the end of the relationship.

Health
In July 2016, Banks admitted to lightening her skin due to skin blemishes from her birth control and defended the process of skin bleaching. In December of the same year, she revealed that she had a miscarriage and asked her fans for advice and support.

BuzzFeed News wrote Banks "has been frank about her own mental health issues". In 2020, during a plea deal in Manhattan Court to avoid prison time, she was ordered to seek mental health treatment. The British magazine gal-dem reported that she has bipolar disorder.

Sexuality and views on the LGBT community
Banks identifies as bisexual. During the few instances where she has discussed her sexuality with the press, she has expressed dissatisfaction with society's labeling of others based on sexual orientation. In an interview with The New York Times, she stated, "I'm not trying to be, like, the bisexual, lesbian rapper. I don't live on other people's terms." 

Banks has been accused of both homophobia and transphobia, with Out editors stating she is a bully to the LGBT community rather than an ally. In 2015, she used language that PinkNews called homophobic when she called a flight attendant a "fucking faggot" during what they described as an "in-flight meltdown". Later the same month, Banks posted what Billboard called a "Twitter tirade" against the LGBT community when she tweeted the "LGBT community are like the gay white KKK's. Get some pink hoods and unicorns and rally down rodeo drive... If I am to be a part of an LGBT community I want to be in it with people who aren't so weak or so easily moved ya know." In 2020, she stated gay men were "appropriating horse culture" by using harnesses, ketamine, and sexual lubricant. The following year, she said trans women are "just gay boys on hormones using male aggression to force their ways into women's spaces."

Political views 
Banks is known for publicly speaking out on African-American civil rights issues, with a commentator at Splice Today describing her as having "that hot New York temper where she will pop off if you cross her the wrong way". In December 2014, she called for over $100 trillion to be paid to African Americans as financial reparations for the enslavement of their ancestors, citing U.S. reparations to Native American communities and the German reparations to Jewish survivors of the Holocaust as precedents. Using Twitter, she urged young African Americans to take an interest in such issues, adding that "We are the children of the people who perished in the name of modern capitalism and we deserve a piece of that fucking pie". She added that reparations could be used to improve educational prospects for black Americans.

In 2016, Banks took to Twitter to express her endorsement of Donald Trump's 2016 presidential campaign, clarifying that "I have no hope for America ... I think Donald Trump is evil like America is evil and in order for America to keep up with itself it needs him ... politicians are inherently evil, I trust the one who is most transparent." She retracted her endorsement of Trump in October 2016, posting on Facebook: "I made a major mistake endorsing toupey-toupee. Women's rights are important and we must protect them." Nonetheless, after Trump won the presidency, she posted, "He is my fucking hero right now. I am elated."

In April 2022, Banks posted an Instagram story repeatedly chastising Ukraine in the 2022 Russian invasion of the country. She claimed, unsubstantiated, that Ukraine's president Volodymyr Zelenskyy denied the ability for African exchange students to leave the country. She also claimed without evidence that Ukraine was using their embassies in African countries to recruit mercenaries to fight in Ukraine. Banks stated that Zelenskyy was trying to provoke a global nuclear war and urged Ukraine to surrender. In a previous Instagram story from April 1, she had spoke about Russia's president Vladimir Putin, calling him her "favorite super villain ever".

Disputes and controversies
Banks has developed a reputation for disputes with several public figures on social media, particularly Twitter, with Complex noting that "she gets more attention for her public feuds than she does for her music".

Banks has been involved in altercations with crew and passengers aboard commercial flights, resulting in her being removed from airliners, and she has accused some foreign airlines of racism against her. She also denounced Israeli "racists" and stated that she will "never ever ever ever ever" come back to Israel.

In May 2016, Banks posted what several media outlets described as a racist and homophobic rant against Zayn Malik on Twitter, later targeting young actress Skai Jackson. As a result, Banks was dropped by her UK booking agency and an upcoming hip-hop festival, and her Twitter account was suspended. Later Twitter accounts were created then suspended, most recently in 2022.

In December 2016, Banks posted a series of videos on Instagram detailing her cleanup of a closet in her apartment where she claims to have been practicing witchcraft. She admitted to practicing "three years worth of brujeria". The video appeared to show dried blood, feathers, and the carrion of dead chickens. In January 2021, she received criticism after posting a video on Instagram of her digging up and cooking her dead pet cat. She later said in an interview that she did not eat the cat and exhumed it for taxidermizing purposes.

In January 2019, Banks posted xenophobic remarks about Irish people after performing in Ireland, in which she used ethnic slurs and mocked the Great Famine. That August, she posted xenophobic remarks about Swedish people after performing in Sweden, adding that she "would really love to see someone bomb the shit out of this place".

Discography

 Studio albums
 Broke with Expensive Taste (2014)

Filmography

Tours
Headlining
 Mermaid Ball (2012–13)
 Broke with Expensive Taste Tour (2014–15)
 Azealia Banks: North American Tour (2017)

Featured act
 ShockWaves NME Awards Tour (2012)

Awards and nominations

See also
 LGBT culture in New York City
 List of LGBT people from New York City

References

Further reading

External links

 
 
 
 

1991 births
Living people
African-American activists
American women rappers
African-American women rappers
African-American women singer-songwriters
American hip hop singers
African-American actresses
Bisexual singers
Bisexual songwriters
Bisexual actresses
East Coast hip hop musicians
Fiorello H. LaGuardia High School alumni
LGBT African Americans
LGBT people from New York (state)
LGBT rappers
NME Awards winners
LGBT-related controversies in music
Obscenity controversies in music
People from Harlem
Rappers from Manhattan
21st-century American rappers
21st-century American women singers
American modern pagans
21st-century women rappers
American electronic musicians
American LGBT singers
American LGBT songwriters
20th-century American LGBT people
21st-century American LGBT people
21st-century African-American women
American bisexual actors
Singer-songwriters from New York (state)
Twitter controversies
American witchcraft
People with bipolar disorder